KIPP Texas Public Schools, is the branch of the KIPP charter school network in the U.S. state of Texas.

It consists of four regional offices each in Austin, Dallas, Houston, and San Antonio.

History
Circa 2003 KIPP had four separate charter school networks in the state for each of the regions it operated in: Austin, Dallas, Houston, and San Antonio.

Mark Larson, a graduate of Trinity University, established the San Antonio branch in 2003. He eventually became the chief external officer of KIPP Texas, as well as the KIPP San Antonio superintendent.

Larson resigned in 2019.  he is the head of City Education Partners (CEP). Allen Smith became the head of the KIPP San Antonio schools.

In 2018 KIPP announced that its four Texas divisions would merge into a single statewide network.

Schools

Houston area
 KIPP Houston had 12,100 students. 

 High schools(9-12)
 KIPP: East End High School (2020)
 KIPP: Connect High School (2018) serving Gulfton and Sharpstown
 KIPP Generations Collegiate (KGC) (2011) (north Houston)
 KIPP Houston High School (2004)
 KIPP Northeast College Preparatory (2013)
 KIPP: Sunnyside High School - Opened in 2010. KIPP Sunnyside HS serves students from the Sunnyside, Third Ward, and Hiram Clarke areas.
 Middle schools(5-8)
KIPP Voyage Academy for Girls (2009)
 KIPP Mosiac Academy (2020)
 KIPP 3D Academy(2001)
 KIPP Academy (1994) (west Houston)
 KIPP Academy West (2015) (far west Houston)
 KIPP CONNECT Middle School (2014)
 KIPP Courage College Prep at Landrum Middle School(2012) (Spring Branch), at Landrum Middle School of the Spring Branch Independent School District
 KIPP Intrepid (2008)
 KIPP Journey (2019) (west Houston)
 KIPP Liberation(2006) (Third Ward)
 KIPP Nexus (2017) (northwest Houston)
 KIPP Polaris Academy for Boys (2007) (northeast Houston)
 KIPP Prime College Prep (2016) (East End)
 KIPP Sharpstown College Prep(2007)
 KIPP Spirit College Prep (2006)(Sunnyside area)
 In 2015 Children at Risk ranked this school as "F".
 Elementary schools(K-4)
 KIPP Mosiac Primary(2020)
 KIPP Climb Academy (2016)
 KIPP CONNECT Primary school (2014)
 KIPP Dream Prep(2006) (north Houston)
 KIPP Explore Academy(2009) (southeast Houston)
 KIPP Journey (2019) (west Houston)
 KIPP Legacy Preparatory School (northeast Houston)
 KIPP NEXUS Primary School (2017) (northwest Houston)
 KIPP PEACE Elementary School(2011) 
 KIPP SHARP Prep(2008)
 KIPP SHINE Prep(2004) (west Houston)
 KIPP Unity Primary (2015)
 KIPP: Zenith Academy (Sunnyside area) - KIPP Zenith opened as part of a wave of KIPP elementary schools opening in 2010. In 2015 Children at Risk ranked this school as "F".
 Closed schools
 KIPP North Forest Lower School and Lower Girls School

San Antonio area
The San Antonio branch was known as  KIPP San Antonio Public Schools
 High schools
 grades 9-12
 KIPP: University Prep
 grade 9
 KIPP: Somos Collegiate ("somos" means "we are" in Spanish)
 Middle schools
 Grades 5-8
 KIPP: Aspire Academy
 KIPP: Camino Academy
 Grades 5-7
 KIPP: Poder Academy ("poder" means "Power" in Spanish)
 Elementary schools
 Grades K-4
 KIPP: Esperanza Primary School ("esperanza" means "hope" in Spanish)
 KIPP: Un Mundo Primary School ("un mundo" means "a world" in Spanish)

See also
 Education in San Antonio
 List of state-chartered charter schools in Houston
 Education in Houston

References

External links
 KIPP Texas
 Former divisions
 
 

Schools in San Antonio
Schools in Bexar County, Texas
Charter schools in Texas
Schools in Harris County, Texas
Charter schools in Houston